The Saharan shrew (Crocidura tarfayensis) is a species of mammal in the family Soricidae. It is found in Mauritania and Morocco. Its natural habitats are rocky areas and sandy shores.

References

Saharan shrew
Mammals of North Africa
Fauna of Western Sahara
Fauna of the Sahara
Saharan shrew
Taxonomy articles created by Polbot